George Brady may refer to:

 George Brady (Holocaust survivor) (1928–2019), Czech-born Canadian Holocaust survivor
 George F. Brady (1867–1903), United States Navy sailor and Medal of Honor recipient
 George K. Brady (1838–1899), United States Army officer
 George Stewardson Brady (1832–1921), British natural historian